Paraguay observes UTC−04:00 for standard time (PYT), and UTC−03:00 for daylight saving time/summer time (PYST).

Daylight saving time
Paraguay observes DST under decree 1867 of March 5, 2004. DST ends on the third Sunday of March and starts on the first Sunday of October.

In 2007, DST started on October 15, 2006 and ended on March 11, 2007.

In 2010, Paraguay changed its own DST rules because of the energy crisis, ending DST on the second Sunday in April, a month later than previous years. 
In 2013 Paraguay changed the ending date of daylight saving to the fourth Sunday in March.
The starting date remains unchanged.

In 5 August 2020, an initiative arose to keep the daylight saving time as the official year-round time, with the intention to align Paraguay with neighbors Argentina, Brazil and Uruguay.

See also
Daylight saving time by country

References

 
Paraguay